Hardeman is an unincorporated community in Saline County, in the U.S. state of Missouri.

History
A post office called Hardemann was established in 1890, and remained in operation until 1906. The community has the name of the Hardeman family of settlers.

References

Unincorporated communities in Saline County, Missouri
Unincorporated communities in Missouri